Prahran Town Hall is a civic building located on the corner of Chapel Street and Greville Street in Prahran, a suburb of Melbourne, Australia.

After the amalgamation of the City of Prahran with the City of Malvern in 1994 to form the City of Stonnington, the Town Hall now functions as secondary offices for the new City.

The original Town Hall was built in 1861 to the design of local architects Crouch and Wilson in the Italianate style of Victorian architecture popular in Melbourne at the time, including Italian Renaissance inspired interior spaces. The building was extended in 1888 to include a City Hall in a similar style.

The clock tower was designed by Charles D'Ebro and built in 1890 above the municipal offices and council chambers for the former City of Prahran. In the 1960s, the decorative tower was truncated.

See also
List of Town Halls in Melbourne
City of Stonnington
List of mayors of Stonnington
List of mayors of Prahran

References 

Town halls in Melbourne
Italianate architecture in Melbourne
1861 establishments in Australia
Buildings and structures in the City of Stonnington
Government buildings completed in 1861
Clock towers in Australia